Polymas of Thessaly may refer to:

Polydamas of Skotoussa, wrestler
Polydamas of Pharsalus in Thessaly. He was entrusted by his fellow-citizens about 375 BC, with the supreme government of their native town

See also
Polydamas (disambiguation)